Abronia morenica, the Sierra Morena arboreal alligator lizard, is a species of lizard in the family Anguidae. It is endemic to the Sierra Madre de Chiapas in southern Mexico.

Description
Abronia morenica possesses three distinct features that differentiate it from the other members of the subgenus Lissabronia to which it has tentatively been assigned. These are (1) lack of frontonasal–frontal contact, (2) unexpanded supranasals, and (3) a lack of posterior subocular–primary temporal contact. Adult males measure  in snout–vent length. The tail is about 1.6–1.7 times the snout–vent length.

References

morenica
Endemic reptiles of Mexico
Reptiles described in 2020